Leopold Schwarzschild (8 December 1891, in Frankfurt am Main, Germany –  2 October 1950, in Santa Margherita Ligure, Italy) was a German author.

Writings
His book World in Trance (1943) is a history of international relations during the interwar years. A review in Foreign Affairs called it an "attempt to reinterpret the history of the two inter-war decades in terms of the progressive disintegration of Allied resistance to Germany's military revival". It was praised by Winston Churchill but criticised by H.G. Wells, who called Schwarzschild "superficially intelligent and massively stupid", and Michael Foot, who denounced it as "a facile, scintillating treatise which...has received applause from those weary brains which prefer the dismal past to the adventurous future". A. J. P. Taylor called the book a "brilliant argument in favour of firmness".

In the first edition of his The Open Society and Its Enemies (1945), Karl Popper distinguished between Karl Marx himself and his followers, arguing that they had transformed Marx's works into an unscientific dogma. However, Popper added a note to the fifth edition: "Some years after I wrote this...Leopold Schwarzschild's...The Red Prussian...became known to me...it contains documentary evidence, especially from the Marx-Engels correspondence, which shows that Marx was less of a humanitarian, and less of a lover of freedom, than he is made to appear in my book. Schwarzschild describes him as a man who saw in 'the proletariat' mainly an instrument of his own personal ambition. Though this may put the matter more harshly than the evidence warrants, it must be admitted that the evidence itself is shattering".

Antony Flew called Schwarzschild's biography of Marx "the most salutary and least devout of all the now numerous biographies". Isaiah Berlin said that "Schwarzschild's evidence is, so far as it goes, accurately and even pedantically sifted; his research is minute, his scholarship impressive...[Marx] emerges as an almost incredible compound of treachery, envy, sadism, megalomania and paranoia". However, Berlin added that "[t]his portrait could, of course, have been achieved only by an interpretation of the facts which, while it cannot be formally refuted, is too unplausible to commend itself without qualification to serious students of the subject".

Works

End to Illusion: A Study of Postwar Europe (1934).
World in Trance (1943).
Primer of the Coming World (1944).
Karl Marx: The Red Prussian, The Universal Library, Grosset & Dunlap (1947).
The Red Prussian: The Life and Legend of Karl Marx (1948; 2nd ed. 1986).
Chronicle of a Downfall: Germany, 1929-1939 (2010).

Further reading

References

External links
 
Guide to the Leopold Schwarzschild Collection at the Leo Baeck Institute, New York.

1891 births
1950 deaths
German sociologists
20th-century German writers
20th-century German male writers
People from Frankfurt
Jewish emigrants from Nazi Germany to the United States
German people of World War I
20th-century German non-fiction writers